The women's high jump at the 2018 IAAF World U20 Championships was held at Ratina Stadium on 13 and 15 July.

Records

Results

Qualification
The qualification round took place on 13 July, in two groups, both starting at 11:40. Athletes attaining a mark of at least 1.84 metres ( Q ) or at least the 12 best performers ( q ) qualified for the final.

Final
The final was held on 15 July at 13:42.

References

high jump
High jump at the World Athletics U20 Championships